Djibouti made its Paralympic Games debut at the 2012 Summer Paralympics in London, sending one representative (Houssein Omar Hassan) to compete in athletics.

See also
 Djibouti at the Olympics

External links
International Paralympic Committee

References